Barbados competed at the 1992 Summer Olympics in Barcelona, Spain. Seventeen competitors, sixteen men and one woman, took part in seventeen events in five sports.

Competitors
The following is the list of number of competitors in the Games.

Athletics

Men's 100m metres
Henrico Atkins 
 Heat — 10.83 (→ did not advance)

Men's 800 metres
Stevon Roberts
 Heat — 1:52.30 (→ did not advance)

Men's 5.000 metres
Leo Garnes
 Heat — 15:21.95 (→ did not advance)

Men's 4 × 400 m Relay
Seibert Straughn, Roger Jordan, Edsel Chase, and Stevon Roberts   
 Heat — DSQ (→ did not advance)

Men's Triple Jump
Alvin Haynes 
 Qualification — 15.93 m (→ did not advance)

Boxing

Cycling

One male cyclist represented Barbados in 1992.

Men's sprint
 Livingstone Alleyne

Men's 1 km time trial
 Livingstone Alleyne

Sailing

Men's Sailboard (Lechner A-390)
Brian Talma
 Final Ranking — 394.0 points (→ 40th place)

Shooting

See also
Barbados at the 1991 Pan American Games

References

External links
Official Olympic Reports

Nations at the 1992 Summer Olympics
1992
Olympics